The 1998 Senior League World Series took place from August 16–22 in Kissimmee, Florida, United States. Diamond Bar, California defeated host Conway, Florida in the championship game.

Teams

Results

Winner's Bracket

Loser's Bracket

Placement Bracket

Elimination Round

Notable players
Zack Greinke (Conway, Florida) - MLB pitcher
Jeffrey Miller, Diamond Bar Pitcher

References

Senior League World Series
Senior League World Series
1998 in sports in Florida